The Le Grand Bridge is an abandoned concrete girder bridge built in 1914–1915. It is an early example of concrete-girder work by the Iowa State Highway Commission.

History 
The LeGrand Bridge carried traffic over the Iowa River for more than fifty years. The bridge is a multiple-span reinforced concrete girder construction. This type of bridge construction was typical in Marshall County, Iowa since the Brockway Act of 1913. Marshall county supervisors contracted with Des Moines-based Capital City Construction Company to build the bridge, which was completed early in 1915. The county later rechanneled the river and rerouted the road. The LeGrand Bridge now stands abandoned over a backwater of the river.

See also 
Le Grand Bridge (1896)

References

Bridges completed in 1914
Bridges in Marshall County, Iowa
National Register of Historic Places in Marshall County, Iowa
Road bridges on the National Register of Historic Places in Iowa
Concrete bridges in the United States
Girder bridges in the United States